Bare is a small settlement in Kolašin, Montenegro. According to the 2011 census, it had a population of 63 people.

The settlement is most known as the birthplace of Amfilohije (Radović), metropolitan bishop of the Serbian Orthodox Church.

References

Populated places in Kolašin Municipality